is a 1980 Japanese Mecha Animated series produced by Tokyo Movie Shinsha, and a modern style remake of Mitsuteru Yokoyama's manga Tetsujin 28-go. It was directed by Tetsuo Imazawa and produced by both Shigeru Akagawa and Toru Horikoshi. It aired on Nippon Television from October 3, 1980 to September 25, 1981 with a total count of 51 episodes.  Fred Ladd and TMS converted the series into The New Adventures of Gigantor, which was broadcast on the Sci-Fi Channel in the United States from September 9, 1993 to June 30, 1997.

English opening narration

Japanese cast
Eiko Hisamura as Shotaro Kaneda
Ikuko Tani as Utako Shikishima
Yoshio Kaneuchi as Dr. Shikishima
Kousei Tomita as Inspector Ohtsuka
Kumiko Takizawa as Makiko Shikishima
Ikuo Nishikawa as Robby
Keiko Toda as Prince Gula
Kenji Utsumi as Space Demon King
Osamu Kobayashi as Branch
Kazuyuki Sogabe as Narrator

English cast
Barbara Goodson as Jimmy Sparks, Marana/Lady Shroud, Bonnie Brilliant
Doug Stone as Bob Brilliant
Tom Wyner as Inspector Blooper, Dr. Kendamu, Moldark, Narrator
Gregg Berger as Coldark
Jeff Winkless as Opening Narration

Broadcast
The series was created by Tokyo Movie Shinsha and broadcast on Nippon TV in Japan between October 3, 1980 and September 25, 1981, every Friday from 18:00 to 18:30 (JST).

The series was adapted for North America by Fred Ladd and broadcast as The New Adventures of Gigantor on the Sci-Fi Channel from September 9, 1993. This broadcast ended on June 30, 1997 after reruns.

The series was also broadcast in the 1980s in Arab countries (as Thunder Giant), Spanish-speaking countries (as Ironman 28), Italy (as Super Robot 28), Hong Kong and South Korea.

Episodes

Release
All 51 episodes span on two DVD box set collections, and were released in Japan by Movic in December 2001 and March 2002, respectively. The Blu-ray version was released in Japan by Warner Bros. Home Entertainment, the first box was released in October 2016  and the second in December 2016. The Japanese version was released by Discotek Media on a 4-disc Blu-ray on January 29, 2019.

Video games
In January 2012 New Tetsujin-28 was announced to appear in Super Robot Wars Z2: Regeneration Chapter.

References

External links 

 
 
 The New Adventures of Gigantor at Skooldays
 Anoboy

1980 Japanese television series debuts
1981 Japanese television series endings
1993 American television series debuts
1994 American television series endings
Nippon TV original programming
Animated television series about robots
Tetsujin 28-go
Anime series
Discotek Media
1980s Japanese television series

ar:رعد العملاق